Peter Philipp (born 18 February 1972) is a Swiss middle-distance runner. He competed in the men's 1500 metres at the 1996 Summer Olympics.

References

1972 births
Living people
Athletes (track and field) at the 1996 Summer Olympics
Swiss male middle-distance runners
Olympic athletes of Switzerland
Place of birth missing (living people)